DWAS is an acronym that may refer to:

 Doctor Who Appreciation Society
 Jack and Jill (dance) or Dance With A Stranger, a format of competition in partner dancing